John Pitney may refer to:

 John J. Pitney (born 1955), American political scientist
 John Oliver Halstead Pitney (1860–1928), American lawyer from New Jersey